
Gmina Kalinowo is a rural gmina (administrative district) in Ełk County, Warmian-Masurian Voivodeship, in northern Poland.

Villages
Gmina Kalinowo contains the villages and settlements of Borzymy, Czyńcze, Długie, Dorsze, Dudki, Ginie, Golubie, Golubka, Grądzkie Ełckie, Iwaśki, Jędrzejki, Kalinowo, Kile, Koleśniki, Krzyżewo, Kucze, Kulesze, Laski Małe, Laski Wielkie, Lisewo, Łoje, Makosieje, Marcinowo, Maże, Mazurowo, Mikołajki, Milewo, Piętki, Pisanica, Prawdziska, Romanowo, Romoty, Skomętno Wielkie, Skrzypki, Stacze, Stare Cimochy, Stożne, Sypitki, Szczudły, Turowo, Wierzbowo, Wysokie, Zaborowo, Zanie and Zocie.

Neighbouring gminas
Gmina Kalinowo is bordered by the gminas of Augustów, Bargłów Kościelny, Ełk, Olecko, Prostki, Raczki, Rajgród and Wieliczki.

References

Polish official population figures 2006

Kalinowo
Ełk County